John Brooks (8 March 1927 – 9 July 2018) was an English footballer who played in the Football League for Stoke City.

Life and career
Brooks was born in Stoke-on-Trent and played in the youth ranks at Stoke City. He made two appearances in the first team during the 1950–51 season but failed to make it as a professional footballer and entered amateur football with Eccleshall Town.

He died in Stoke-on-Trent in July 2018 at the age of 91.

Career statistics

References

1927 births
2018 deaths
Association football midfielders
English Football League players
English footballers
Stoke City F.C. players